The 1998 Rugby Canada Super League season was the first season for the RCSL.

Standings
Western Division
{| class="wikitable" style="text-align: center;"
|-
! width="250"|Team
! width="20"|Pld
! width="20"|W
! width="20"|D
! width="20"|L
! width="20"|F
! width="20"|A
! width="25"|+/-
! width="20"|BP
! width="20"|Pts
|-
|align=left| Vancouver Island Crimson Tide
|6||5||1||0||257||60||+197||0||22
|-
|align=left| Fraser Valley Venom
|6||5||1||0||209||77||+132||0||22
|-
|align=left| Calgary Mavericks
|6||3||0||3||139||186||-47||1||13
|-
|align=left| Saskatchewan Prairie Fire
|6||3||0||3||145||135||+10||0||12
|-
|align=left| Vancouver Wave
|6||3||0||3||143||150||-7||0||12
|-
|align=left| Edmonton Gold
|6||1||0||5||91||222||-131||0||4
|-
|align=left| Manitoba Buffalo
|6||0||0||6||123||243||-120||1||1
|}

Eastern Division
{| class="wikitable" style="text-align: center;"
|-
! width="250"|Team
! width="20"|Pld
! width="20"|W
! width="20"|D
! width="20"|L
! width="20"|F
! width="20"|A
! width="25"|+/-
! width="20"|BP
! width="20"|Pts
|-
|align=left| Nova Scotia Keiths
|3||3||0||0||61||22||+39||0||12
|-
|align=left| Newfoundland Rock
|3||2||0||1||82||60||+22||1||9
|-
|align=left| New Brunswick Black Spruce
|3||1||0||2||41||66||-25||1||5
|-
|align=left| Montreal Olympiques
|3||0||0||3||46||82||-36||1||1
|}

Note: A bonus point was awarded for a loss of 7 points or less

MacTier Cup

The Vancouver Island Crimson Tide (Western Division champions) defeated the Nova Scotia Keiths (Eastern Division Champions) 28-8 to win the MacTier Cup, played in Halifax, Nova Scotia on 11 July 1998.

1998 MacTier Cup Final

References

Rugby Canada Super League seasons
RCSL Season
1998 in Canadian rugby union